Teknonymy (from , "child" and , "name"), is the practice of referring to parents by the names of their children. This practice can be found in many different cultures around the world. The term was coined by anthropologist Edward Burnett Tylor in an 1889 paper. Such names are called teknonyms, teknonymics, or paedonymics.

Teknonymy can be found in:
 Various Austronesian peoples:
 The Cocos Malays of Cocos (Keeling) Islands, where parents are known by the name of their first-born child. For instance, a man named Hashim and his wife, Anisa, have a daughter named Sheila. Hashim is now known as "Pak Sheila" (literally, "Sheila's Father") and Anisa is now known as "Mak Sheila" (literally, "Sheila's Mother").
 Balinese people
 Dayak and related indigenous peoples of Borneo, like the Penan
 The Betsileo people of Madagascar, in particular the Zafimaniry subgroup
 the language of the Madurese people of Indonesia
 the Mentawai people of Indonesia
 Tao people of Taiwan
 the Korean language; for example, if a Korean woman has a child named Su-min, she might be called Su-min Eomma (meaning "mother of Su-min")
 Chinese language has similar but also very flexible phenomenon. Suppose a boy's nickname at home is “二儿” (Er'er), then the father of the child can call the child's mom as "他妈"/"孩儿他妈"/"二儿他妈", meaning "his mom"/"child's mom"/"Er'er's mom," respectively. Similar applies to the boy's mom calling her husband (i.e. the boy's dad) by changing "妈" (mom) to "爸/爹" (dad). This usage is mostly used between the parents of the kid, but can also be used in some limited scenarios, e.g. the child's teacher calling the child's parents.
 the Arab world; for example, if a Saudi man named Hasan has a male child named Zayn, Hasan will now be known as Abu Zayn (literally, "Father of Zayn"). Similarly, Umm Malik (Malik is a name used for males) is "Mother of Malik". This is known as a kunya in Arabic and is used as a sign of respect for others.
 Amazonia
 the Zuni language
 Swahili, as spoken in Tanzania and Kenya; for example, if a woman has a son named Musa, the woman would be known as Mama Musa. Musa's father would be known as Baba Musa.
 to some extent, Habesha people in the Horn of Africa
 the Yoruba language of Western Africa; for example, if a woman has a son named Femi, will now be known as iya Femi (meaning mother of Femi) and her husband baba Femi (meaning father of Femi).
the Hausa language of Africa; for example, if a man has a son named Adam, the man will be known as Baban Adam, while his wife would be called Maman Adam.
the Nupe people of Nigeria; for example, if a man has a son named Isyaku, he will be known as Baba Isyaku, whereas his wife would be called Nna Isyaku.
Bangladeshi people

See also 
 Michitsuna no Haha
 Korean name
 Patronymy

References

External links 
 

Family
Onomastics